Ishaqzaade is a 2012 Indian Hindi-language romantic action film written and directed by Habib Faisal, and produced by Aditya Chopra under Yash Raj Films. The film stars debutant Arjun Kapoor and Parineeti Chopra in the lead roles, with Gauahar Khan, Natasha Rastogi, Anil Rastogi and Shashank Khaitan in supporting roles. The official trailer was unveiled on 15 March 2012, and the film was released on 11 May 2012. 

Ishaqzaade received positive reviews from critics, with particular praise directed towards Chopra's performance, and was a commercial success at the box-office.

At the 58th Filmfare Awards, Ishaqzaade received 3 nominations, including Best Actress (Chopra) and Best Male Debut (Kapoor). Additionally, Chopra received the National Film Award – Special Mention at the 60th National Film Awards for her performance in the film.

Title
The title of the film is modeled on common Hindi slangs ending in zaade (meaning "child of" in Persian influenced languages such as Hindi and Urdu); for example, shehzaade (meaning "son of a king" or "prince") with the first part of the name Ishaq being a vulgar pronunciation of Ishq (meaning "passionate romantic love"). The title may be loosely translated as "Rebel Lovers" (literally "Children of Love").

Plot
The Chauhans and the Qureshis are two political families whose rivalry and mutual hatred for one another goes back generations. Parma (Arjun Kapoor) is a good-for-nothing local thug, grandson of the patriarch Surya Chauhan. Surya often takes digs at Parma for being the useless son of his widowed daughter-in-law Parvati, and this makes Parma try to prove himself worthy. Zoya (Parineeti Chopra), a practising Muslim who offers Salat five times a day, is the trigger-happy, hot-tempered, only daughter in a traditional Muslim house full of brothers, along with her patriarchal chauvinistic parents. She desires to go into politics like her father Aftab, but this dream is constantly laughed at by her family since she is a woman.

When the local elections take place, Parma and Zoya's canvassing efforts lead to a clash between them, which results in Parma being slapped across the face by Zoya. While Parma is enamored by Zoya's fearlessness, Zoya is intrigued by his charm, including his inability to properly pronounce her name, calling her "Joya", instead of the proper "Zoya". They fall in love after a series of incidents bring them together, and elope; Parma converts to Islam and changes his name to Parvez. After marriage, Parma and Zoya consummate the marriage in an empty train carriage. Parma soon reveals that he tricked Zoya - the wedding ceremony was fake, and they are not married. He perpetrated the sham wedding to get her to have sex with him, which would bring shame upon her family. He, therefore, took revenge against her clan, and repaid the humiliation of her slapping him earlier on. Zoya is left heartbroken and devastated, as Parma joins his family in a celebration of "becoming a man". Zoya attempts to invade the celebration in order to shoot Parma, but is intercepted by Parvati, who urges her to calm down. Parvati tells Parma that he must honour his marriage vows regardless of whether he meant them, and stand right by Zoya. Despite Parvati's attempts to conceal her, the Chauhans come to know of Zoya's presence in their home, and in the heat of the moment, Surya shoots Parvati when she tries to defend her son and daughter-in-law from the bloodthirsty gang. Parma realizes his mistake and protects Zoya from being murdered by his family.

Parma and Zoya go on the run from their families and take refuge in a brothel. At first, Zoya is still furious with Parma for his deception and even believes that he was trying to sell her to the brothel. She attacks him with a shard of broken glass, cutting his arm badly. The brothel madame, Chand Bibi (Gauahar Khan), who knows Parma from early on, allows them to stay while Parma recovers and Zoya begrudgingly nurses him. He asks her for forgiveness, and though she refuses to grant it, she shows that she still loves him through little actions of affection. However, their mutual grief soon brings them together, giving their love a second chance. The two exchange wedding vows in a legitimate ceremony at the brothel without any religious conversion. Zoya decides to try reconciling with her family, and takes Parma to her home to win over Aftab. They are instead met with hostility and gunshots when Aftab puts a gun to her head, threatening to kill his own daughter.

The couple flees as Aftab sends his men after them. Zoya and Parma prepare to run away to Jaipur, but when Parma leaves the safety of the bus to get water, their pursuers spot him and apprehend Zoya. She breaks free as Parma furiously fights to save her. They are reunited briefly, but quickly are found by Parma's former friends and run to the local college, which is closed for Eid. The two rival families decide that Parma and Zoya's marriage is a stain on their respective religious communities and political careers, and they try to kill the couple by joining forces.

Parma and Zoya take refuge on a terrace, engaging in a gunfire battle. With only a few bullets left, Zoya realises that they are outnumbered. She asks Parma to shoot her so that their love can win and they can die in the victory of their love, rather than be riddled with bullets by their own families, and allow hatred to win. The two shoot each other in the abdomen willingly and die in each other's arms, smiling. The goons check if they are dead and go inform the two families, who leave satisfied.

The film ends with Parma and Zoya's bodies lying on the terrace, and an on-screen message that explains how thousands of lovers like them are killed every year only because of falling in love outside their caste and/or religion.

Cast
Arjun Kapoor as Parma Chauhan, who falsely converts under the name Pervez
Parineeti Chopra as Zoya "Joya" Qureshi
Gauahar Khan as Chand Bibi
 Ratan Singh Rathore as Aftab Qureshi
 Anil Rastogi as Surya Chauhan
 Natasha Rastogi as Parvati Chauhan
 Charu Rastogi as Zoya's Mother
 Pravin Chandra as Chauhan's Goon
 Aradhana Dhawan as Rakshan
 Akash Bathija as Bikram
 Abdullah Osman as Chandu
Shashank Khaitan as Dharma Chauhan
 Ankit Kakkar as Karma Chauhan
 Aftab Khan as Shadaab Qureshi
 Jafarpal Dhillon as Sohraab Qureshi
 Faisal Husain as Mehtab
 Romil Saraswat as Javed
 Meeta Bandhu as Archana Nahak
 Jay Shanker Pandey ' Jay ' as Chauhan's flunky

Themes & Political Issues
The film itself was both praised and drew some anger for its blunt confrontation of current issues in India regarding things such as premarital sex, marriage outside an individual's religion, caste, or other community, as well as the very real issue of honor killing. It also addressed and somewhat criticized the hypocrisy of men who engage in premarital sex (they are celebrated and considered men in the eyes of the community) versus women who do the same (they are considered a disgrace and a source of shame). In addition, the film was notable for presenting the struggles of Indian widows and prostitutes in a sympathetic light.

Production

Casting
It was announced that newcomer Arjun Kapoor had joined the cast of Ishaqzaade in late 2011. Earlier, Arjun Kapoor was to debut in another Yash Raj production, Virus Diwan. However, the film got shelved and therefore Yash Raj Films designed Ishaqzaade for Arjun Kapoor. Rekha and Chinni Prakash, National Award winners for Jodhaa Akbar (2008) were chosen as the choreographers, while Sham Kaushal is the action director.

Filming
Filming began on 15 October 2011. A major part of the film was shot in Lucknow, Hardoi, Uttar Pradesh and at other sites near Lucknow.

Soundtrack

The music of the film is composed by Amit Trivedi, who has worked the first time with Yash Raj Films, and lyrics were penned by Kausar Munir, except "Chokra Jawaan" which was written by Habib Faisal. The tracks "Pareshaan" and "Jhallah Wallah" were remixed by Abhijit Vaghani. The soundtrack album was released on 20 April 2012. The background score was composed by Ranjit Barot.

Track listing

Reception

The album received positive reviews, with major praise for the "Pareshaan" song, which also topped the charts for a long period of time.

Music Aloud rated the album 9/10, saying that "Amit Trivedi brushes off that relative low phase of 2011 with a stunner for Ishaqzaade." Bolly Spice gave the album 9/10, explaining that "Amit Trivedi is definitely one of the best composers around and he proves his detractors wrong with this soundtrack that stays true to his style and shows his versatility. It is easily the best soundtrack of this year so far." GlamSham gave the album 8/10, noting that "Overall the album delivers a satisfying listening experience and should add one more success to both the producer and composer's credits." Joginder Tuteja of Bollywood Hungama gave the album 7/10, saying that "With Kausar Munir's lyrics further setting the stage for him, Amit Trivedi comes up with a soundtrack which may surprise listeners to begin with (due to its unusual flavour) but should eventually find acceptance in due course of time." Times of India gave the album 3 out of 5 stars, commenting that Ishaqzaade "may not have too much on the platter with just 5 original tracks but it still manages to strike a chord with the listener. The album is definitely worth a shot." Richa Bhatia of Times of India praised the soundtrack's use of dubstep, a genre of electronic dance music, along with the "punchy" lyrics, "chutney and dash." Film composer Anu Malik also praised the soundtrack, stating that "it is the first time I have observed dubstep in a film and it's incredible."

Reception

Critical Reception
Ishaqzaade received positive reviews from critics. Taran Adarsh of Bollywood Hungama gave the movie 3.5 stars out of 5, saying that "On the whole, ISHAQZAADE, a volatile and intense story with ample doses of fanatical romance, should appeal to a pan-India audience. This broadly engaging love story has a winsome pair who deliver dexterous performances, besides popular music and several poignant moments, which should appeal to fans of mainstream films. Go for it!" Mrigank Dhaniwala of Koimoi gave the movie 3.5 stars out of 5, commenting that "On the whole, Ishaqzaade is an entertaining fare which works on the strength of its first half and the performances." Khalid Mohamed of Deccan Chronicle gave the movie 3.5 stars out of 5, concluding that "Ishaqzaade kicks off weakly and has its share of the deja pooh. Gradually, though, it gets under your skin..and rocks. Absolutely See-Grade."

Rachit Gupta of Filmfare gave the movie 3 stars out of 5, quoting that "On the face of it, this is a fantastic Indian adaptation of Romeo and Juliet. But if you've ever loved someone without a sense of inhibition, then deeper in the recesses of its story, Ishaqzaade is a saga of love being more important than life and death." Daily Bhaskar gave the movie 3 stars out of 5, writing that "Brilliant performance by the lead cast, an ecstatic climax which breaks the typical 'happily-ever-after' ending, is surely one of the top reasons to visit your nearest theatre. People from metros might find it difficult to relate to the culture or political drama that involves frequent gun-firing. Parineeti and Arjun's chemistry will remind one of the Ek Duuje Ke Liye genre of love stories from Bollywood." Shomini Sen of Zee News gave the movie 3 stars out of 5, noting that "Habib Faisal's earlier film Do Dooni Chaar (2010) had captured the Delhi and Punjabi culture well. In Ishaqzaade, he captures a small town in northern India and its typical nuances well."

Box-Office

Ishaqzaade grossed  worldwide.

India

The movie collected  nett in its first weekend and  nett in its first week. It broke the record of Jaane Tu... Ya Jaane Na (2008) for the highest first weekend and first week collections for a Hindi non-starcast film in India. The movie had a good second weekend and collected  nett. The movie had a good second week, collecting  nett. The movie had a strong third weekend and went on to collect  nett. The movie collected  nett in its third week and thus declared a "hit". The film's lifetime collections in India were Rs. 47.50 crore.

Overseas

Ishaqzaade was released in the Middle East and smaller markets. It grossed  at the end of its run. The film was not released theatrically in major markets like North America, Canada, United Kingdom, Nepal, Pakistan, New Zealand and Australia.

Awards
National Film Awards
 National Film Award – Special Mention – Parineeti Chopra

58th Filmfare Awards
 Best Female Playback Singer – Shalmali Kholgade ("Pareshaan")
 Nominated - Best Actress - Parineeti Chopra
 Nominated - Best Music - Amit Trivedi
 Nominated - Best Male Debut - Arjun Kapoor

Star Screen Awards
 Best Playback Singer - Female – Shalmali Kholgade ("Pareshaan")
 Best Playback Singer - Male - Javed Ali ("Ishaqzaade")

Stardust AwardsSuperstar of Tomorrow – Male
 Superstar of Tomorrow - Female - Parineeti Chopra
 Superstar of Tomorrow - Male - Arjun Kapoor
 Best Lyrics - Habib Faisal and Kausar Munir ("Ishaqzaade")
 Best New Musical Sensation - Female – Shalmali Kholgade ("Pareshaan")

Star Guild Awards
 Best Playback Singer - Female - Shalmali Kholgade ("Pareshaan")

Zee Cine Awards
 Best Male Debut - Arjun Kapoor
 Best Lyrics - Kausar Munir ("Pareshaan")
 Sa Re Ga Ma Pa Fresh Singing Talent - Shalmali Kholgade ("Pareshaan")

TOIFA Awards
 Best Playback Singer - Female - Shalmali Kholgade ("Pareshaan")

5th Mirchi Music Awards
 Nominated - Album of The Year - Amit Trivedi, Kausar Munir
 Nominated - Female Vocalist of The Year - Shalmali Kholgade ("Pareshaan")
 Nominated - Upcoming Female Vocalist of The Year - Shalmali Kholgade ("Pareshaan")
 Nominated - Upcoming Lyricist of The Year - Habib Faisal ("Chokra Jawaan")
 Nominated - Song Recording / Sound Engineering of the Year - Dipesh Sharma, Vijay Dayal, Karan Kulkarni & Alok Punjani ("Pareshaan")

Home Media
The film is available on Amazon Prime Video and Apple TV+.

References

External links

 Official website
 

2012 films
2012 action drama films
2012 romantic drama films
Indian romantic drama films
Indian romantic action films
Indian action drama films
Films shot in Lucknow
Yash Raj Films films
2010s Hindi-language films
Indian interfaith romance films
2010s romantic action films